Nacsport Video Analysis Software has been designed for analysing sports through video. It is available for Windows and MacOS and was developed by the Spanish company Nacsport.

Nacsport can be used for both live and retrospective analysis and can be adapted for use in sports such as association football, field hockey, basketball, or rugby.

There are five different editions of Nacsport: Basic, Basic+, Scout, Pro and Elite. They share common features, but Pro and Elite contain advanced tools designed for professional analysts.

History
Nacsport was originally developed to analyse field hockey but was soon expanded to meet the needs of other sports.

Nacsport was first released in 2001 as commercial software.

Features 
The main function of Nacsport to analyse a game or match using key performance indicators. These are converted into interactive buttons which can be clicked whilst watching a video or live performance. Clicking or “tagging” a video in this way creates a short video clip of the action and a data register. This information is added to a database which can be used to review and analyse a team or individual performance, creating sports intelligence.

Notable users

References

2020 software
Business software for Windows
Sports software